USA-180, also known as GPS IIR-13 and GPS SVN-61, is an American navigation satellite which forms part of the Global Positioning System. It was the thirteenth of twenty one Block IIR GPS satellites to be launched, and the last in the original configuration. It was built by Lockheed Martin, using the AS-4000 satellite bus.

USA-180 was launched at 05:39:00 UTC on 6 November 2004, atop a Delta II carrier rocket, flight number D308, flying in the 7925-9.5 configuration. The launch took place from Space Launch Complex 17B at the Cape Canaveral Air Force Station, and placed USA-180 into a transfer orbit. The satellite raised itself into medium Earth orbit using a Star-37FM apogee motor.

It is used to broadcast the PRN 02 signal, and operates in slot 1 of plane D of the GPS constellation. As of 2019 it remains in service.

References

Spacecraft launched in 2004
GPS satellites
USA satellites